The N Seoul Tower, officially the YTN Seoul Tower and commonly known as Namsan Tower or Seoul Tower, is a communication and observation tower located on Nam Mountain in central Seoul, South Korea. The -tall tower marks the second highest point in Seoul and is considered a local landmark.

Built in 1969, the N Seoul Tower is South Korea's first general radio wave tower, providing TV and radio broadcasting in Seoul. Currently, the tower broadcasts signals for Korean media outlets, such as KBS, MBC, and SBS.

History 

Built in 1969 at a cost of approximately US$2.5 million, Seoul Tower was completed on 3 December 1971, designed by architects at Jangjongryul though at the time the facility interior was not furnished. N Seoul Tower opened to the public in October 1980. Since then, the tower has been a landmark of Seoul. Seoul Tower had its name changed to N Seoul Tower in 2005, with the "N" standing for 'new', 'Namsan', and 'nature.' Approximately 15 billion KRW was spent in renovating and remodeling the tower.

When N Seoul Tower's original owner merged with CJ Corporation, it was renamed the N Seoul Tower (official name CJ Seoul Tower). YTN acquired it from CJ Corporation in 1999, and changed its name to YTN Seoul Tower. It has also been known as the Namsan Tower or Seoul Tower. It is also Korea's first general radio wave tower that holds transmissions antennas of KBS, MBC, SBS TV, FM, PBC, TBS, CBS, and BBS FM.

N Seoul Tower, along with Changdeokgung Palace, was selected as one of the world's top 500 tourist destinations in Lonely Planet’s Ultimate Travel List, based on global travel expert evaluation and reader preference surveys.

Floors and amenities 
N Seoul Tower is divided into three main sections, including the N Lobby, N Plaza, and the N Tower. The N Plaza consists of two floors, while the N Tower consists of four floors.

Lobby 
Plaza P0/B1 (Lobby): Includes: Entrance to Observatory, Information Desk, Alive Museum, Cafe, Children's Theater, Nursing room.

The N Lobby holds the N Gift, N Sweetbar, BH Style, the Alive Museum, Memshot, Nursing Room, Information booth, a cafe, and entrance to observatory.

Plaza 
Plaza P1: Includes: Ticket booth, Food Court, Light Garden, Grass Terrace, Souvenir Shop, Characters & Photos.

N Plaza has two floors. The first floor includes the ticket booth, N Terrace, N Gift and a burger shop. The second floor houses the Place Dining, an Italian restaurant, and the Roof Terrace where the "Locks of Love" can be found.

Plaza P2: Includes: Restaurant, Roof Terrace, Cafe

Tower 
The N Tower has four floors: 1F, 2F, 3F, and 5F (most buildings in Korea avoid having fourth floors). There are four  observation decks (the 4th observation deck, which is the revolving restaurant, rotates at a rate of one revolution every 48 minutes), as well as gift shops and two restaurants. Most of the city of Seoul can be seen from the top. Close to N Seoul Tower is a second lattice transmission tower. The tower offers a digital observatory with a 360° panoramic view that showcases Korea's history through 32 LCD screens. This is located on the third floor of the N Tower.

Tower T1: Includes: Korean Restaurant "Hancook"

Tower T2: Includes: Analogue Observatory, The Wishing Pond, Sky Restroom, Sky Coffee, Photo Studio

Tower T3: Includes: Digital Observatory, Shocking Edge and Digital High-powered Telescope, Gift shop

Tower T5: Includes: A revolving restaurant

Attractions

Namsan Tower 

Many visitors ride the Namsan cable car up the Mt. Namsan to walk to the tower. The tower is renowned as a national landmark and for its cityscape views. The 236.7 m (777 ft) tower sits on the Namsan mountain (243m or 797 ft). It attracts thousands of tourists and locals every year, especially during nighttime when the tower lights up. Photographers enjoy the panoramic view the tower offers. Each year, approximately 8.4 million visit the N Seoul Tower, which is surrounded by many other attractions South Korea offers, including Namsan Park and Namsangol Hanok Village. Visitors may go up the tower for a fee that differs for the following groups: children, elderly and teenagers, and adults. Rates differ for each package and group size.

In 2012, surveys conducted by Seoul City revealed foreign tourists ranked the N Seoul Tower as the number one tourist attraction. The N Seoul Tower is now also a symbol of Seoul.

Lighting of the Tower 
The N Seoul Tower is illuminated in blue from sunset to 23:00 (22:00 in winter) on days where the air quality in Seoul is 45 or less. During the spring of 2012, the Tower was lit up for 52 days, which is four days more than in 2011. The tower uses the latest LED technology to offer visitors a digital, cultural art experience through 'light art.'  The N Seoul Tower puts on many different shows, including the "Reeds of Light" and "Shower of Light."

An exception to this is Earth Day. On Earth Day, lights were held nationwide to promote awareness of energy conservation. At 8 p.m KST. on that day, lights at N Seoul Tower on Namsan disappear into darkness.

Love Padlocks 
In a poll of nearly 2,000 foreign visitors conducted by the Seoul Metropolitan Government in November 2011, 16 percent stated that hanging named padlocks on the Tower fence as a symbol of love was their favorite activity in Seoul. This attraction is situated on the 2nd floor of the N Plaza, at the Roof Terrace. The "Locks of Love" is a popular location for people to hang locks that symbolize eternal love, and has been depicted in many Korean television shows, dramas, and movies for this reason.

'Love padlocks' is a common couple activity consists of the purchasing of a padlock and key, where initials, messages and symbols can be personally inscribed onto the surface of the lock with markers and pens. Securing the padlocks on the fences filled with locks of previous participants, the key is often thrown away as a symbol of everlasting love. This is similar to the love locks in Paris, France, on the Pont Neuf bridge.

Wishing Pond and Observatory 
The N Tower also holds many other attractions including the digital observatory and the Wishing Pond. The Wishing Pond can be found on the second floor of the tower, where people throw coins into the pond while making a wish. The coins are collected and donated to help develop schools in China and Southeast Asia, especially in underdeveloped areas. The observatory, renovated in 2011, is on the third floor. The observatory not only offers the 360° view of the city, but also exhibits 600 years of Korean history through 36 LCD screens. The fifth floor houses a French restaurant known as N Grill.

Other events and attractions 
In 2008, the Teddy Bear Museum was opened at the Tower, with a -tall Christmas tree made with 300 teddy bears to celebrate its opening. It showcases teddy bears in the past, present, and future of Seoul, as well as teddy bears models in Seoul attractions, such as the Cheonggyecheon Stream, Myeongdong, Insadong, and Dongdaemun.

Displays of 55-inch OLED Panels 
OLED panels are displayed all around the Namsan Seoultower from level 1 to 4. In level 1,  red rose petals will be greeted by 9m OLED Tunnel with welcome messages. And we can see  see the 15m x 3m Panorama OLED, a curved display of the view of the Gwanghwamun Gate and Gyeongbokgung Palace through the four seasons. On level 2, we can see the OLED Circle, shaped like a round belt hanging in the air. On level 4, there is a 24m long wavy structure decorated with images of wish lanterns, flames and patterns of dancheong to represent beautiful sky across Seoul. And next, we can experience '3D video world'.

Broadcasting use 
N Seoul Tower is used as a radio/television broadcast and communications tower.

Television broadcasters

ATSC 2.0 stations

ATSC 3.0 stations

Radio broadcasters

Gallery

See also

List of towers
YTN Group

References

External links

 
 
N Seoul Tower : Official Seoul City Tourism
 

Landmarks in South Korea
Towers completed in 1971
Buildings and structures in Yongsan District
Tourist attractions in Seoul
Towers in South Korea
Towers with revolving restaurants
YTN Group
Service companies of South Korea
Radio masts and towers
Observation towers
1971 establishments in  South Korea
20th-century architecture in South Korea